is a Japanese football player. She plays for Japanese Nadeshiko League club Orca Kamogawa. She played for the Japanese national team.

Club career

Urawa Reds
Kira was born in Usuki on July 5, 1991. After graduating from high school, she joined for Urawa Reds in 2010. She was selected Best Young Player awards in 2011 season.

Melbourne City
In December 2020, Kira joined Australian club Melbourne City to play for the first time outside of her home country.

Orca Kamogawa
In June 2021, Kira returned to and signed with Nadeshiko League club Orca Kamogawa.

National team career
In August 2008, Kira was selected for the Japan U-17 national team for the 2008 U-17 World Cup. She played three games and scored four goals. On May 8, 2014, she debuted for the Japan national team against New Zealand. She was a member of Japan for the 2014 Asian Cup and the 2014 Asian Games. Japan won the championship at the Asian Cup and second place at the Asian Games. She played 12 games and scored 5 goals for Japan in 2014.

National team statistics

International goals

Honours 
Japan
Winner
 AFC Women's Asian Cup: 2014

References

External links 

 

1991 births
Living people
Association football people from Ōita Prefecture
Japanese women's footballers
Japan women's international footballers
Urawa Red Diamonds Ladies players
Melbourne City FC (A-League Women) players
Nadeshiko League players
Asian Games medalists in football
Asian Games silver medalists for Japan
Footballers at the 2014 Asian Games
Women's association football forwards
Medalists at the 2014 Asian Games